Jagdeep Singh, also known by the name Jagdeep Singh Kaka Brar or Kaka Brar, is an Indian politician and the Member of the Legislative Assembly representing the Muktsar Assembly constituency in the Punjab Legislative Assembly. He is a member of the Aam Aadmi Party. He was elected as the MLA in the 2022 Punjab Legislative Assembly election.

Career
Prior to entering politics, Brar worked as an agriculturist and owned agricultural land in Chak Jawahrewala village. Brar's elder sister, Gurpreet Kaur Gill, actively participated in Anna Hazare’s 2011 Indian anti-corruption movement in New Delhi. He was inspired by her to enter active politics.

Brar had served twice as a Municipal Councillor. In 2017, he unsuccessfully contested the Punjab Assembly polls from Muktsar as an AAP candidate.

Member of Legislative Assembly 
Brar was elected as the MLA in the 2022 Punjab Legislative Assembly election to the 16th Assembly of the Punjab Legislative Assembly in March 2022. He won by a margin of 34,194 votes defeating his closest competitor, Kanwarjit Singh of Shiromani Akali Dal. Brar got a total of 76,321 votes, holding 51.09% of the total votes polled in the constituency. The Aam Aadmi Party gained a strong 79% majority in the sixteenth Punjab Legislative Assembly by winning 92 out of 117 seats in the 2022 Punjab Legislative Assembly election. MP Bhagwant Mann was sworn in as Chief Minister on 16 March 2022.
Committee assignments of Punjab Legislative Assembly
Member (2022–23) Committee on Questions & References

Electoral performance

Personal life
His wife, Naginder Kaur, is also an agriculturist. Brar has three children.

References

External links
 

Living people
Punjab, India MLAs 2022–2027
Aam Aadmi Party politicians from Punjab, India
People from Punjab, India
Year of birth missing (living people)